Brandon Scott Schantz (July 26, 1980 - December 6, 2007) was a broadcaster, sports director and television producer. He was, perhaps, best known as an on-camera host for Movies.com and for producing music videos for the rock band Rooney. Schantz had previously become the youngest local news station sports director in the history of the CBS network and its affiliates.

Biography

Early life
Schantz was a native of San Francisco and graduated from San Ramon Valley High School in the East Bay neighborhood of Danville, California.

Schantz graduated from the University of Texas at Austin with a bachelor's degree in broadcast journalism in 2002.  He worked as a production intern with KEYE-TV, an Austin, Texas, CBS affiliate from 2000 until 2002 while attending the University of Texas. Additionally, Schantz also interned within the sports department at KXAN as an undergraduate.

Career
Schantz was hired as the Sports Director at KGWN-TV, a CBS affiliate in Cheyenne, Wyoming, upon his graduation from college. In doing so, Schantz, who was 22 years old when he was hired by KGWN, became the youngest local news station sports director in the history of the CBS network. He also appeared on camera at KGWN as a sports reporter and Sportscaster.

Schantz departed KGWN in the mid-2000s and moved to Los Angeles to pursue a career as a producer and television host. He established a production company at the age of 25, Brandon Schantz Productions and established a production headquarters with partners Kevin Dobski at Santa Monica Studios in Santa Monica, CA.  Collectively Schantz produced projects, music videos and live television events during 2006 and 2007, including a music video for the Rooney single, "I Should've Been After You", a Southern California based rock band. Brandon Schantz Productions (BSP) specialized in music videos, television, and short form digital web content.

Schantz was also hired as an on-camera host and producer for Movies.com, which was acquired by the Walt Disney Company.

Death
Schantz was diagnosed with lymphoma in the Spring of 2007, and underwent surgery for the disease in October 2007. He continued to work on his production company and Movies.com while undergoing treatment. During this time, he made a brief appearance in the seventh episode of The Real World: Hollywood, which was filmed in 2007, and aired June 25, 2008. Schantz, who was working as a host and producer for Movies.com at the time, gave internships to three Real World cast members, Kimberly Alexander, Nick Brown and Sarah Ralston, who sought to become on-air hosts. Schantz died on December 6, 2007, at the age of 27. His death, and Brown's reaction to it, was chronicled on-camera. He was survived by his parents, Sean and Kim Schantz, his siblings, Ryan and Kaylee, and his grandparents.

References

External links 
Brandon Schantz on the Real World
Brandon Schantz Memorial Endowment Fund
Brandon Schantz Productions
 The Daily Texan: UT alum left mark on TV, producing

1980 births
2007 deaths
American television journalists
Moody College of Communication alumni
Businesspeople from San Francisco
Television producers from California
American television news producers
American sports announcers
American male journalists
20th-century American businesspeople